Johnny Ace Palmer is an American close-up magician. He is famous within the worldwide magical community for his prodigious sleight-of-hand abilities.

Early life
Palmer was born in Warren, Ohio, in 1960 and attended Lakeview High School in Ohio until his graduation. Following high school, Palmer attended Kent State University in Ohio in the late 1970s and early '80s.  He came to magic early in life, and as a teenager, performed a stage act with his sister, Peggy. Palmer likes to say that he was "put on this Earth to do magic." In college, he majored in both theater arts and psychology, stating he wanted to prepare himself for his future career as a magician.

Magic career
Palmer started performing magic in the early 1970s, many times performing at churches and giving a Christian message with his magic. His mother, Ann Aanne, helped get him bookings and was one time asked what he could do that was really amazing to which she replied, "He can pull an eight ball from a thimble." This was not a skill that Palmer had even tried but, because he was very creative, figured out a way to do it for the performance and has been one of his signature skills ever since.  Palmer was able to get a job as Bingo the Clown at The Ground Round Restaurant in Niles, Ohio in the late 1970s on the weekends and incorporated his magic to entertain customers before and after their meal.  He used Ground Round tokens instead of coins to perform his coin magic and prided himself on being able to do sleights without using gaffed(trick) coins. Working on the weekends afforded Palmer the opportunity to hone his skill with sleight-of-hand and practice his cups and balls routine to help make it the classic it is today.

Throughout the 1980s, Palmer entered and competed in a large number of American magic competitions, culminating in his first-place wins at the annual convention of the International Brotherhood of Magicians and the annual convention of the Society of American Magicians.

Then he set his sights on international goals, entering the world-championship of magic, a competition called FISM, in 1988.  He presented a 10-minute act which was one of the first competition acts to utilize stage techniques in a closeup setting. One routine for which he became known was a version of the Cups & Balls in which the final load was three live baby chicks.

Palmer's skills won him the title of World-champion magician. In so doing, he became the first close-up magician in history to receive the Grand Prix award, and only the second American to win (Lance Burton was the first in 1982). This award is given out only once every three years.

The Magic Castle named Palmer Best Close-Up Magician two years in a row (1987, 1988) as well as Lecturer of the Year (1996, 1999). He performs at the Castle twice a year, in September during the week that encompasses Labor Day and in April during the week that encompasses April Fool's Day.

As of 2006, Palmer is the only magician to be awarded both the International Brotherhood of Magicians' Gold Cups Award of Excellence (which he received in 1983) and the Society of American Magicians' Gold Medal Award of Honor (which he received in 1986).

Palmer was one of the original seven magicians who opened Caesars Magical Empire in June,  1996. However, his home base for nearly two decades has remained suburban Los Angeles.

With many awards under his belt, Palmer has turned down many opportunities to pursue a lucrative stage magic career. Instead, he has said that he prefers the excitement and personal contact involved in closeup magic.  He has performed tableside magic regularly at many restaurants through the years, including his current weekly gig on Sunday evenings at Earth Wind & Flour in Santa Monica, which he has had since 1994. Past restaurants in Los Angeles have included the decade that he spent at Zach's Italian Cafe (Studio City) and the several years that he spent at the Green Street Restaurant (Pasadena).

Palmer's knowledge was utilized by Mattel when the company vied for the merchandising contract to create toys for the Harry Potter film franchise. Palmer assisted the company in designing toys with a magical theme. Warner Bros. ended up awarding the contract to Mattel.

In 1994, the Library of Congress created an exhibit to be displayed at schools, libraries and malls across the country. Called Grand Illusion: The Art and Practice of Magic, the exhibit featured only five living magicians, one of whom was Palmer.

Palmer was featured in an episode of the TV series Masters of Illusion aired March 2009.

Bibliography
Johnny appeared on the cover of The Linking Ring Magazine in 1998.

See also

List of magicians

References

External links
Official website

Living people
American magicians
Year of birth missing (living people)
Academy of Magical Arts Close-Up Magician of the Year winners
Academy of Magical Arts Lecturer of the Year winners
Academy of Magical Arts Parlour Magician of the Year winners